Robert C. Feldman (born June 14, 1940) is an American songwriter and record producer, best known for his work in the 1960s with fellow writers Jerry Goldstein and Richard Gottehrer, including "My Boyfriend's Back", "I Want Candy", and "Sorrow".

Life and career
Feldman was born in Brooklyn, New York City.  He was raised in an Orthodox Jewish home and briefly studied to become a cantor.  He graduated from Abraham Lincoln High School alongside Neil Sedaka, and was a member of the All-City Choir alongside Neil Diamond and Barbra Streisand.  Together with his friend and neighbor Jerry Goldstein, he was a dancer on Alan Freed's WNEW-TV show The Big Beat, and in 1959 the pair co-wrote a theme song for the show.  Feldman and Goldstein started writing regularly together, and, as Bob and Jerry, wrote and recorded "We Put the Bomp", an answer record to Barry Mann's "Who Put the Bomp".

In 1962, they met fellow songwriter Richard Gottehrer, and formed FGG Productions.  Feldman said: "I was the dreamer, Jerry was the schemer and Richie was the voice of reason". The trio wrote several hit singles together, including "My Boyfriend's Back" by The Angels.  In 1964, in response to the "British Invasion", they formed their own group, The Strangeloves, who had hits with "I Want Candy", "Cara-Lin", and "Night Time".   With Goldstein and Gottehrer, Feldman also co-wrote "Sorrow" – first recorded by The McCoys and later a hit for both The Merseys and David Bowie – and "Gonna Make It Alone", recorded by Dion and by Ronnie Dio and the Prophets.  The three also produced the McCoys' hit "Hang On Sloopy".
  
In 1966, Feldman and Goldstein moved to California to set up their own office, and also recorded together as the duo Rome & Paris.  Feldman later worked as a record producer with Link Wray, The Belmonts, and others.  In the 1990s, he moved to Nashville, and in 2002 co-wrote Dusty Drake's debut country hit, "And Then". In 2019, he published a book of verse, lyrics and memoirs, Simply Put!: Thoughts and Feelings from the Heart.

He is the father of actor Corey Feldman, who was born from his marriage to cocktail waitress Sheila Feldman.

References

Record producers from New York (state)
American male songwriters
Living people
1940 births
Jewish American musicians
21st-century American Jews